The 1930 Harvard Crimson football team represented Harvard University. They were led by fifth-year head coach Arnold Horween and played their home games at Harvard Stadium.

Schedule

References

Harvard
Harvard Crimson football seasons
Harvard Crimson football
1930s in Boston